Xylotoles apicalis is a species of beetle in the family Cerambycidae. It was described by Broun in 1923. It is known from New Zealand.

References

Dorcadiini
Beetles described in 1923